An election was held on Tuesday, November 8, 2016, to elect the non-voting delegate to the United States House of Representatives from American Samoa's at-large congressional district. The election coincided with the elections of other federal and state offices, including the larger American Samoa general election, as well as the nationwide 2016 United States House of Representatives elections and the 2016 United States general elections. 

Incumbent Amata Coleman Radewagen, a Republican who had held the seat since 2015, successfully sought re-election to a second term. Aumua Amata won re-election with 75.4% of votes cast, the highest number of votes for any elective office in the history of American Samoa.

Background
In November 2014, Radewagen defeated 10-term incumbent Democratic Rep. Eni Faleomavaega in a crowded race for the seat.

Candidates
Five candidates filed to run for election to American Samoa's lone seat in the United States House of Representatives: three women and two men. All elections in American Samoa were officially non-partisan, though candidates have identified with a particular political party.

Democratic
Vaitinasa Dr. Salu Hunkin-Finau, educator, former President of American Samoa Community College, 2012 candidate for Governor of American Samoa, sister of former Delegate Eni Faleomavaega.
Paepaetele Mapu Saei Jamias, retired U.S. Army Lieutenant Colonel, President of the American Samoa National Olympic Committee
Meleagi Suitonu-Chapman, retired U.S. federal government employee

Republican
Amata Coleman Radewagen, incumbent Delegate for the United States House of Representatives

Independents
Tim Jones, engineer and 2012 candidate for Governor of American Samoa

Withdrew
Tua'au Kereti Mata'utia, withdrew from race on in July 2016

Campaign
A congressional campaign forum, attended by all five candidates, was held at American Samoa Community College (ASCC) on October 6, 2016.

Results
The general election took place on November 8, 2016, and Radewagen won with over 75% of the vote, according to official results.

References

External links
American Samoa Election Office: Official Certification of Candidate for the November 8, 2016, General Election

2016 American Samoa elections
American Samoa
Non-partisan elections
2016